This is a list of German tariffs.

1834: Zollverein
1879: German tariff of 1879
1885: German tariff of 1885
1887: German tariff of 1887
1902: German tariff of 1902
1925: German tariff of 1925
1968: European Economic Community (Common External Tariff completed 1 July)

Tariffs
Foreign trade of Germany